Kharlamovskaya is a rural locality (a village) in Nikolo-Ramenskoye Rural Settlement, Cherepovetsky District, Vologda Oblast, Russia. The population was 178 as of 2002. There are 14 streets.

Geography 
Ruchyi is the nearest rural locality.

References 

Rural localities in Cherepovetsky District